The Schiedam–Hoek van Holland railway (also called the Hoekse Lijn) is a former railway line and current rapid transit line of the Rotterdam Metro between Schiedam and Hook of Holland (Hoek van Holland) along the Nieuwe Maas, in the west of the Netherlands. The line is also an important freight railway, it is 24 kilometres (15 miles) long.

History 
On 17 August 1891, the first section between Schiedam Centrum and Maassluis was opened as a heavy-rail line. The section between Maassluis and Hoek van Holland Strand followed on 1 June 1893. In 1935, the entire route was electrified.

The Stena Line provides a ferry service to Harwich International Port in Harwich, England, from the Hoek van Holland Haven station. Formerly, other international train services used the line, as far as Moscow or Berlin; travellers can easily change at Hook of Holland to the ferry. Since the opening of the Channel Tunnel in 1994, the importance of this line has decreased sharply.

On 31 March 2017, the final passenger trains of the Nederlandse Spoorwegen ran on the line and they have been replaced by a temporary bus service until the line reopened in 2019 as part of the Rotterdam Metro. The overhead electrification system has been converted to 750 V DC and the railway stations to metro standards. Also, in Maassluis, a new station, Steendijkpolder, is built, but plans for additional intermediate stations in Schiedam and Hoek van Holland have not been specified. The Hoek van Holland Strand station will also be moved closer to the beach, as the name suggests.

Services 
Until 2017, there were five Sprinter trains per hour from Rotterdam Centraal station to Maassluis West and half-hourly services to Hoek van Holland Haven. In the peak season, all trains usually terminating at Maassluis West were extended to Hoek van Holland Haven, and the service between Rotterdam Centraal and Vlaardingen Centrum was increased to every 7.5 minutes. Service to Hoek van Holland Strand was only provided every hour during the summer months.

Between April 2017 and February 2018, four rail-replacement bus lines (711, 712, 156 and 713) run alongside the regular bus lines (56, 57 and 126). These services were being operated by RET.

Rail-replacement services were originally scheduled to run only until September 2017; however, unforeseen events caused a delay in re-opening the track until October 2019. These include more soil contamination and asbestos than anticipated as well as finding cables which had not been documented during preliminary investigations and which had to be removed or, for the ones which were still active, moved.

Metro line B from Nesselande runs with 10-minute intervals from Schiedam to Hoek van Holland Haven, half of which will terminate at Maassluis Steendijkpolder. Furthermore, metro line A provides a service from Binnenhof to Vlaardingen West during peak hours. The line will remain open to freight trains, retaining a connection to the national rail network at Schiedam.

The line was reopened on 30 September 2019 for a test period of four weeks. On 1 November 2019 it was officially reopened.

Stations
 Schiedam Centrum
 Schiedam Nieuwland
 Vlaardingen Oost
 Vlaardingen Centrum
 Vlaardingen West
 Maassluis
 Maassluis West
 Steendijkpolder
 Hoek van Holland Haven
 Hoek van Holland Strand (This station is not included on the metro line and will be reopened on another location in 2022.)

Gallery

References

External links 
 Stena Line
 Information about the Hoekse Lijn from RET
 Information about the Hoekse Lijn project

Railway lines in the Netherlands
Standard gauge railways in the Netherlands
750 V DC railway electrification